Desmodium is a genus of plants in the legume family Fabaceae, sometimes called tick-trefoil, tick clover, hitch hikers or beggar lice. There are dozens of species and the delimitation of the genus has shifted much over time.

These are mostly inconspicuous plants; few have bright or large flowers. Though some can become sizeable plants, most are herbs or small shrubs. Their fruit are loments, meaning each seed is dispersed individually enclosed in its segment. This makes them tenacious plants and some species are considered weeds in places. They have a variety of uses.

Uses

Several Desmodium species contain potent secondary metabolites that are released into the soil and aerially. Allelopathic compounds are used in agriculture in push-pull technology: Desmodium heterocarpon, Desmodium intortum, and Desmodium uncinatum are inter-cropped in maize and sorghum fields to repel Chilo partellus, a stem-boring grass moth, and suppress witchweeds, including Asiatic witchweed (Striga asiatica) and purple witchweed (S. hermonthica). High amounts of antixenotic allomones produced by Desmodium also repel insect pests. Different Desmodium species produce different profiles of organic compounds through their root systems. The reasons for the production of these compounds that have benefited cereal crop production are however unknown.

Tick-trefoils are also useful as living mulch and as green manure, as they are able to improve soil fertility via nitrogen fixation. Most also make good fodder for animals including bobwhite, turkey, grouse, deer, cattle and goats.

Some Desmodium species have been shown to contain high amounts of tryptamine alkaloids, though many tryptamine-containing Desmodium species have been transferred to other genera.

The caterpillars of the lesser grass blue (Zizina otis) and the two-barred flasher (Astraptes fulgerator) feed on tick-trefoils. Deer also appear to rely on some species in certain areas, particularly during the more stressful summer months.

Taxonomy and systematics

The taxonomy and systematics of the many dozens of Desmodium species are confusing and unresolved. Related genera such as Codariocalyx, Hylodesmum, Lespedeza, Ohwia, and Phyllodium were and sometimes still are included in Desmodium.

Taxonomic authorities commonly disagree about the naming and placement of species. For example, Desmodium spirale as described by August Grisebach might refer to a distinct species, but its validity is doubtful. The "Desmodium spirale" of other authorities may refer to D. neomexicanum, D. ospriostreblum, or D. procumbens. Similarly, the plant originally described as D. podocarpum by A. P. de Candolle is Hylodesmum podocarpum today, but "Desmodium podocarpum" might also refer to D. hookerianum or Hylodesmum laxum, depending on the taxonomic authority.

Selected species

Species include:

 Desmodium acanthocladum F.Muell.
 Desmodium canadense (L.) DC. – showy tick-trefoil, Canadian tick-trefoil
 Desmodium canescens (L.) DC. – hoary tick-trefoil
 Desmodium ciliare (Muhl.) DC. – hairy small-leaved tick-trefoil
 Desmodium cuspidatum (Muhl.) Loudon – toothed tick-trefoil, large-bracted tick-trefoil
 Desmodium glabellum (Michx.) DC.
 Desmodium heterocarpon (Michx.) DC. – Asian tick-trefoil
 Desmodium × humifusum (Muhl. ex Bigelow) Beck 
 Desmodium illinoense A.Gray – Illinois tick-trefoil
 Desmodium incanum (Sw.) DC. – creeping beggarweed, Spanish tick-trefoil, Kaimi clover
 Desmodium intortum Greenleaf desmodium, kuru vine, beggarlice, tick clovers
 Desmodium lineatum (Michx.) DC. – linear-leaved tick-trefoil
 Desmodium marilandicum (L.) DC. – smooth small-leaved tick-trefoil
 Desmodium ospriostreblum Chiov.
 Desmodium paniculatum (L.) DC. – panicled tick-trefoil
 Desmodium perplexum B.G.Schub. – perplexed tick-trefoil
 Desmodium rhytidophyllum F.Muell. ex Benth.
 Desmodium rotundifolium DC. – round-leaved tick-trefoil, dollar leaf
 Desmodium triflorum (L.) DC.
 Desmodium tweedyi Britton – Tweedy's tick-trefoil
 Desmodium uncinatum (Jacq.) DC.– silver-leaved tick-trefoil, silverleaf
 Desmodium varians (Labill.) G.Don

Formerly placed here
 Codariocalyx motorius – telegraph plant (as D. gyrans, D. motorium, D. roylei)
 Hylodesmum laxum (as D. laxum DC.)
 Hylodesmum laxum ssp. laxum (as D. austro-japonense, D. bambusetorum, D. gardneri auct. non Benth., D. laxiflorum sensu Miq., D. laxum var. kiusianum, D. laxum ssp. laxum, D. podocarpum auct. non DC. non Hook. & Arn., D. podocarpum DC. var. gardneri sensu Bedd., D. podocarpum DC. var. laxum)
 Hylodesmum leptopus (as D. gardneri Benth., D. laxum auct. non DC., D. laxum ssp. leptopus, D. leptopus, D. tashiroi)
 Hylodesmum podocarpum (as D. podocarpum DC., D. podocarpum DC. var. indicum, D. podocarpum DC. var. japonicum)
 Hylodesmum podocarpum ssp. oxyphyllum (as D. fallax var. mandshuricum, D. japonicum, D. mandshuricum, D. oxyphyllum DC., D. podocarpum DC. var. mandshuricum, D. podocarpum DC. ssp./var. oxyphyllum, D. podocarpum DC. var. polyphyllum, D. podocarpum DC. var. typicum, D. racemosum)
 Lespedeza thunbergii  (as D. formosum, D. thunbergii)
 Lespedeza thunbergii var. thunbergii (as D. penduliflorum Oudem.)
 Ohwia caudata (as D. caudatum)
 Phyllodium pulchellum (as D. pulchellum)
 Dendrolobium umbellatum  (as D. umbellatum  (L.) Benth. 
 Dendrolobium triangulare  (as D. Desmodium umbellatum Moritz.

References
  (2005): Genus Desmodium. Version 10.01, November 2005. Retrieved 2007-DEC-17.

External links 
	

 Trout, K. (2002). Trout’s Notes on the Genus Desmodium. Mydriatic Productions. Better Days Publishing.

 
Forages
Fabaceae genera